Faravan Rural District is a rural district (dehestan) in Kohanabad District, Aradan County, Semnan Province, Iran. The rural district was created out of Kohanabad Rural District in 2011. At the 2006 census, its population was 1,334, in 399 families.  The rural district has 11 villages.

References 

Rural Districts of Semnan Province
Aradan County
2011 establishments in Iran